2006 Nagoya Grampus Eight season

Competitions

Domestic results

J. League 1

Emperor's Cup

J. League Cup

Player statistics

Other pages
 J. League official site

Nagoya Grampus Eight
Nagoya Grampus seasons